Bandar Kangan (also Romanized as Bandar-e Kangān; also known as Kangān and Kangun) is a city in the Central District of Kangan County, Bushehr province, Iran, and serves as capital of the county. At the 2006 census, its population was 23,921 in 5,200 households. The following census in 2011 counted 76,329 people in 9,304 households. The latest census in 2016 showed a population of 60,187 people in 19,225 households.

Language 
The linguistic composition of the city:

References 

Cities in Bushehr Province
Populated places in Kangan County